The Central Institute of Agricultural Engineering (CIAE) is a higher seat of learning, research and development in the field of agricultural engineering, situated in the lake city of Bhopal, Madhya Pradesh, India. It is an autonomous body, an Indian Council of Agricultural Research subsidiary, under the Ministry of Agriculture & Farmer's Welfare, Government of India.

Profile 
ICAR-CIAE was established on 15 February 1976 at Bhopal, with a view to provide a research platform for Agricultural Engineering. The early mandate was to address the areas of farm machinery, post harvest technology and energy in agriculture. However, the range of activity was later extended to cover Agro-Industrial Extension, Instrumentation and Irrigation and Drainage Engineering.

Mandate 

CIAE was established with a mandate to:
Undertake adaptive, applied and basic research leading to development / improvement of equipment, technology, process for production, post- harvest technology and processing and energy use in agriculture and rural industries. 
Develop hardware and technology in cooperation with other ICAR Institutes in the areas of crops, horticulture, aquaculture and animal husbandry for production and processing. 
Provide leadership and co-ordinate network of research with state agricultural universities for generating location-specific technology and value addition. 
Provide input to ICAR for policy interventions with respect to agricultural mechanization, energy management in agriculture, irrigation and drainage and post-harvest management. 
Provide consultancy and undertake sponsored research for agricultural machinery industry and other organizations. 
Act as a repository of information on agricultural engineering. 
Act as a centre for training in research methodologies and technology and conduct graduate, post-graduate and doctoral research programs. 
Collaborate with relevant national and international agencies in achieving the above objectives.

Facilities

Research laboratories
CIAE is equipped with various laboratories:
 Tillage and Soil Dynamics 
 Biochemistry and Microbiology 
 Seeding and Planting 
 Chemical Analysis and Quality Control 
 Plant Protection 
 Food Processing and Product Development 
 Animal Energy 
 Baking 
 Material Testing 
 Fermentation 
 Ergonomics 
 Pilot Plants 
 Cleaning, Grading and Milling 
 Bio-Fuel Energy 
 Food Engineering Properties and Drying 
 Mechanical Power 
 Oil Extraction 
 Irrigation Equipment Testing 
 Food packaging, handling and storage 
 Drainage Engineering

CIAE Research Farm
CIAE Research Farm covers an area of 92.66 hectares distributed for Crop cultivation, Orchards, Water harvesting ponds, Degraded waste land, Sports complex, Roads, Residential and non-residential buildings and a Meteorological observatory. The farm activities are divided into two sections namely Farm Production & Field Research Management Section and Landscaping, Gardening and Horticulture Section.

Research Workshop and Prototype Production Centre
The centre has a Prototype Production Workshop, equipped with machining, welding, grinding, press work, cutting and shearing, tool and die making and heat treatment facilities. The workshop is used for batch production of prototypes for multi-location trials and pilot introduction. CIAE has a Research workshop also catering to the needs related to fabrication of new designs of research prototypes and set-ups and refinement of existing designs.

Library

CIAE has a library which is open to the staff, extension workers and other university students coming under the MOU programs and is home to 11921 books, 4169 bound journals, 3405 reports/ bulletins, 98 CIAE publications, and 245 CD-ROMs. It is housed in an area of 5400 sq ft and subscribes to 135 journals, both Indian and foreign. It is also equipped with computer and related infrastructure.

Prioritization, Monitoring and Evaluation Cell (PME)
PME Cell in CIAE is an NAIP program, established on 1 June 2007, with a mandate to:

 Sensitization of policy makers, research managers, scientists and other stakeholders about PME.
 Inventorying of research resources (manpower and financial) and tracking their allocations by commodities, resources, regions, research programs.
 Interface with ARIS and IPR unit for strengthening database and other decision support system. 
 Facilitate planning and monitoring of research programmes/Five Year Plan. 
 Undertaking impact analysis of research, extension and education programmes and activities. 
 Collaboration with NCAP on the identified research activities or any PME related work. 
 Research Impact Assessment.

Agricultural Knowledge Management Unit
AKMU is the management unit of CIAE on matters related to computers, networking and other areas of digital technology. It maintains the Information and Communication activities of the Institute through modern infrastructure and home developed and outsourced software.

CAD cell
CAD Cell is equipped with modern hardware and software to accommodate the design documentation needs of the institute. It is staffed by experienced personnel who oversee activities from production drawing to the stage of transfer of technology. The cell also provides training facilities on Computer-Aided Design.

Instrumentation cell
The Instrumentation Cell of CIAE is equipped with modern equipment such as:
 Electronic seed drill choke indicator for indicating choking of tractor driven seed drills.
 Pressure transducer
 RTD calibrator 
 Pressure calibrator (Range: 30psi) 
 DC Multi function calibrator 
 Automatic LCRQ bridge 
 Universal Device programmer 
 Load cells (2.5 kN, 1 kN, 2.0 kN 2.5 kN,) 
 Button type miniature load cell 
 Soil moisture telemetry system 
 Electronic Pressure transducer (Range: 20 kg/cm2) with indicator 
 Data logger (DT-800) 
 RFID system for identification of livestock 
 Dual DC regulated power supply

Guest House and Trainees' Hostel
The institute also maintains a Guest House to accommodate 48 guests and as a Trainees' Hostel to house 32 trainees.

International Training Centre
The International Training Centre (ITC) at the Institute provides facilities for International training and Conferences. The centre has a conference hall and communication and accommodation facilities.

Courses 
CIAE is affiliated to the Indian Agricultural Research Institute and is accredited Indian Council of Agricultural Research by the New Delhi for its MTech course in Energy in Agriculture. It also extends its infrastructure facilities to students for research programs.

Agricultural Technology Information Centre (ATIC)
CIAE is home to an Agricultural Technology Information Centre (ATIC), established in November 1999, to act as a single window for technology information, advisory services and supply of prototypes and farm equipment. The centre has a declared mandate to:
 Provide a single window delivery system for technology and products for accelerating the rate of adoption and for easy accessibility to end-users. 
 Facilitate direct access for the visitors of the institutional resources available in terms of technology, advice, products etc. for reducing technology dissemination losses. 
 Help farmers and entrepreneurs in problem solving and decision-making. 
 Create a strong linkage between different research divisions / units and users of the technology .
 Provide an elaborative views of improved technologies through published literature and other communication materials such as audio and video facility. 
 Provide mechanism for feed back from users to the institute.

The centre is engaged in the distribution of un-priced and priced publications, the sale of seedling and planting materials, bio-fertilizers, processed farm products, soy food products, fish feed and Video Cassettes/CDs, providing information through Agricultural Equipment Display Center, exhibitions and manufacturers' meet and the collection of feedback and its transmission.

Research and development 

Research and development activities at CIAE may be classified into three major heads:
 Technologies Developed
 Institutional Projects
 Externally Funded Projects

Technologies developed

CIAE is credited with the development of several agricultural and related equipment.
 Tillage Equipment
 Sowing and Planting Equipment
 Weeding & Interculture Equipment
 Harvesting Equipment
 Threshing Equipment
 Cleaning/Grading/Separation Equipment
 Shelling/Dehulling/Peeling Equipment
 Milling Equipment
 Value Addition Equipment
 Energy Gadgets

Institutional projects

CIAE has lined up a series of regular research projects where research fellows and students can participate. The below mentioned list gives a bird's eye view of the research activities at CIAE on a regular basis.
 Tillage And Manure Interactive Effects On Soil Aggregates Dynamics, Soil Organic Carbon Accumulation And By Pass Flow In Vertisols 
 Development of Efficient Spraying System To Reduce Spray Losses 
 Development of spectral reflectance based prototype of variable rate urea application system for top dressing in rice and wheat crops. 
 Adoption and resource assessment of agricultural machinery for resource conservation for permanent bed cultivation of cereals, pulses and oilseeds 
 Draft requirement of selected farm implements operating in vertisol for tractor implement matching. 
 Development of platform type fruits harvesting system for mango, sapota and citrus 
 Design and development of mechanized pruner for high density guava orchard 
 Design and development of two stage furrow opener in seed-cum-fertilizer drill for application of seed and fertilizer at appropriate depth 
 Design and development of multi millet thresher 
 Design and development of Arecanut (Careca Catech Linn) sheath size reduction machine 
 Demonstration of conservation agricultural machinery in selected village cluster of MP State 
 Assessment of hearing impairment of tractor drivers 
 Adaptation/development of system for harvesting Makhana in ponds 

 Development of GPS Based variable rate granular fertilizer applicator for basal dose application 
 Yield mapping through grain combine harvester fitted with yield monitors in soybean-wheat cropping system 
 Design and development of zero till drill for sowing in heavy residue condition 
 Development/adaptation of animal drawn garlic planter and digger
 Agricultural Accidents survey of Madhya Pradesh
 NAIP Sub-Project On A Value Chain In Major Seed Spices For Domestic And Export Promotion 
 Development of soy and multigrain based nutritionally balanced functional foods for children (National Fellowship) 
 Applications of modified atmospheric packaging techniques for shelf life extension of selected horticultural crops 
 Process development for production of instant soymilk powder 
 Adoption/refinement of technology for development of millet-soybased functional foods and utilization of by-products 
 Development of process and equipment for cleaning and dehusking of kodo and kutki minor millets 
 Impact of defatted soyflour supplemented food products on health of children 
 Soy-fortified functional foods for selected target groups 
 Defatted soyflour for food uses – Survey of soybean industries and policy issues for soy food promotion 
 Development of production of soybutter at pilot scale 
 Study on health response of differently processed soy foods consumed in India 
 Use of machine vision for distinguishing among crop varieties 
 Technology for production of probiotic culture and development of probiotic soy cheese and soy milk powder 
 Design and development of post harvest heating chamber and ripening chamber for banana 
 Blending of millet flour with hydrocolloid for quality breads 
 Estimation of post harvest losses in selected crops in four districts of MP 
 Disinfestations of Grains using MW Energy [Approved in principle] 
 Development of mechanization system for effective sett/bud treatment for sugarcane (Collaboration with SBI, Coimbatore 
 Development of mechanization package for banana cultivation (Collaborative project with NRC Banana, Tiruchirapalli) [Agreed in principle] 
 Development of banana central core stem slicer and juice extractor 
 Studies on the mechanical processing of Moringa oleifera leaves [Approved in principle] 
 Value Chain On Biomass Based Decentralization Power Generation For Agro-Enterprises 
 Development of a system for purification and storage of biogas for engine application 
 Studies on generation of bio-char from different crop residues 
 Establishment of biogas cum solar energy based hybrid electricity generation system for dairy farm and allied activities [Approved in principle] 
 Establishment of precision farming development center and its operation in Madhya Pradesh 
 Fertigation Strategies for Fruit and Vegetable Crop(s) in Vertisols 
 Development of 50 m2 greenhouse with provision for top opening 
 ORP on soil moisture based micro-sprinkler (PC) irrigation 
 Promotion of manufacturing of agricultural equipment through prototype production, capacity building and support to manufacturers/entrepreneurs 
 Capacity building through trainings and outreach programmes 
 Development of national database and its user-friendly retrieval system on commercially manufactured agricultural equipment/technologies 
 Development of business model for custom hiring for different agro climatic zones 
 Custom hiring business models and machinery packages for selected agro climatic regions of India [Approved in principle] 
 Quantifying the mechanization status of selected cropping pattern in Madhya Pradesh 
 Development/adoption of suitable harvesting device for oil palm 
 Development of on the go soil electrical conductivity and pH measurement device 
 Diffusion and adoption of crop production and farm engineering technologies for acceptability

Externally funded projects
CIAE has four types of externally funded projects.

NAIP project
CIAE hosts many National Agricultural Innovation Project (NAIP) projects.
 Value Chain on Biomass based decentralized power generation for agro enterprises. 
 Precision farming technologies based on Microprocessor and Decision Support Systems for enhancement input application.
 Efficiency in production agriculture. 
 Evaluation of X-ray, Computed Tomography (CT) And Magnetic Resonance Imaging (MRI) for detecting the internal disorders.
 A value chain in major seed spices for domestic and export promotion. 
 Visioning, policy analysis and gender (Completed on 31/03/2012).

NICRA project
The National Innovations on Climate Resilient Agriculture (NICRA) was inaugurated on 2 February 2011 CIAE as one of core institutes with Strategic Research, Technology Demonstration, Capacity Building and Sponsored/ Competitive Grants were the main elements of the project. CIAE hosts the researches on enhancement of resilience of Indian agriculture to climate change and climate vulnerability.

The following are the ongoing R and D activities at CIAE under NICRA project:
 Adoption and performance assessment of agricultural machinery for resource conservation under permanent bed cultivation of soybean-wheat and maize-gram crops. 
 Development of spectral reflectance based prototype of variable rate urea application system for top dressing in rice and wheat crops. 
 Design and development of two stage furrow openers suitable for variable depth seed and fertilizer application in maize-wheat cropping system in central India 
 Development of pre-emergence herbicide strip applicator as an attachment to sowing devices for wide spaced crops. 
 Study of existing irrigation pumping system practices in Madhya Pradesh and suggestions if any for improving the performance. 
 Investigation on entrained gasification of agro residue for power generation. 
 Environmental impact assessment of different energy conversion processes for efficient utilization of surplus crop residues and Generation of bio-char from different crop residues. 
 Self-sustainable energy management of dairy farm through efficient utilization of dairy residues. 
 Demonstration and adoptive trials of conservation agriculture implements in selected village cluster of Madhya Pradesh state.

National Fund project
The National Fund for Basic, Strategic and, Frontier Application Research in Agriculture provides funding for various CIAE projects on the Use of machine vision for distinguishing among crop varieties. The research program aims to develop methodology for distinguishing among varieties/ germplasm of rice, Indian mustard, chickpea and okra using visible imaging and to optimize imaging and image processing parameters under visible spectral domain. Indian Agricultural Research Institute, New Delhi, National Bureau of Plant Genetics Resources, New Delhi  and Centre for Development of Advanced Computing, Kolkata participate in the project.

National Fellow project
ICAR has placed a National Fellow Project at CIAE on the subject, "Development of Soy and Multigrain based nutritionally balanced functional foods for children". The project aims to eradicate malnutrition in children by making cost effective nutritious and easily assimilated food available to children. The main focus of the project in on the use of seasonal, local, low-cost and abundantly available raw food ingredients having high nutrition and functional properties like cereals, coarse cereals and millets, soybean, dairy ingredients and horticultural produce.

The main objectives of the project are:
 Development of cost effective nutritive functional foods with combination of locally available cereals, soybean, fruits, vegetables and dairy ingredients for children. 
 Analysis of the products for nutritional, safety, quality and consumer acceptability attributes. 
Optimisation of ingredients and process parameters for preparation of ready to eat mixes, snacks specially designed for children. 
 Study of developed foods in selected districts through feeding trials on children. 
 Dissemination of the technology through trainings and entrepreneurial development.

Publications
CIAE has brought out many publications for students and general community.
 
 
 
 
 
 
 
 
 
 
 
 
 
 
 
 
 
 
 
 
 
 
 
 
 
 
 
 

Research Publications
 Publication No. 1
 Publication No. 2

List of countries by agricultural output

References

External links 
 http://www.minglebox.com/college/Central-Institute-Of-Agricultural-Engineering-Bhopal
 http://www.icar.org.in/en/node/325
 Profile on ICAR files
 Profile on YouTube
 http://www.highereducationinindia.com/institutes/central-institute-of-agricultural-434.php
 http://college.globalshiksha.com/Central-Institute-of-Agricultural-Engineering/517517956438741
 http://wikimapia.org/2933661/CIAE-Nabi-Bagh-Bhopal
 http://economictimes.indiatimes.com/topic/Central-Institute-of-Agricultural-Engineering
 https://web.archive.org/web/20160306060028/http://www.biotecnika.org/content/march-2014/admission-notification-phd-central-institute-agricultural-engineering-bhopal
 http://www.asti.cgiar.org/node/2085
 http://www.un-csam.org/Activities%20Files/A09105thTC/PPT/in-doc.pdf
 http://kalvimalar.dinamalar.com/Research_detail.asp?id=4
 https://web.archive.org/web/20140121051551/http://www.agricultureinformation.com/mag/2009/10/central-institute-of-agricultural-engineering/
 http://onfarming.com/farming-crops

Indian Council of Agricultural Research
Agricultural organisations based in India
Agricultural universities and colleges in India
Organizations established in 1976
Agriculture in Madhya Pradesh
Research institutes in Bhopal
1976 establishments in Madhya Pradesh